Humanz is the fifth studio album by British virtual band Gorillaz. It was released on 28 April 2017 in the United Kingdom by Parlophone and in the United States by Warner Bros. Records. The album was announced on the band's official Instagram page on 23 March 2017. According to a press release, it was recorded in London, Paris, New York City, Chicago, and Jamaica, and was produced by The Twilite Tone and Remi Kabaka Jr. It was the band's first studio album since 2010's The Fall, and features collaborations with Jehnny Beth, Grace Jones, Kali Uchis, Vince Staples, Popcaan, D.R.A.M., Anthony Hamilton, De La Soul, Danny Brown, Kelela, Mavis Staples, Pusha T, and Benjamin Clementine.

Humanz debuted at number two on the UK Albums Chart and the US Billboard 200, selling over 140,000 copies in its first week of sales. It also debuted at number one in Austria and Switzerland, and at number three in Belgium. The album was nominated for the Grammy Award for Best Alternative Music Album at the 60th Annual Grammy Awards, losing to The National's Sleep Well Beast. Humanz reached the top 10 on the Albums chart  in 23 countries.

Background
After the release of their 2010 album The Fall, rumours began to circulate on the internet that Gorillaz creators Damon Albarn and Jamie Hewlett had fallen out, and that this had led to the band split; People subsequently reported this to be true. Representatives for the band denied the rumours in a statement to Pitchfork. Gorillaz released a single with James Murphy and André 3000 commissioned by Converse, titled "DoYaThing", on 23 February 2012. In April 2012, in an interview with The Guardian, Albarn stated that Gorillaz were "unlikely" to release new music, citing Hewlett's dissatisfaction that his animation had become less central to the band and their performances. In June 2013, Hewlett said that he "believe[s] there is a future for the Gorillaz. But Gorillaz is quite a complicated and expensive thing to produce. So, I think we need to wait a little bit to see what happens because usually in the music industry everything changes."

On 25 April 2014, Albarn released the solo album Everyday Robots. Hewlett revealed that he and Albarn decided to revive Gorillaz after Albarn had played a gig, stating: "...we were at a party afterwards. We'd had a bit to drink, and he said, 'Do you want to do another one?' And I said, 'Do you?' and he said, 'Do you?' And I said, 'Yeah, sure.' I started work on it straight away, learning to draw the characters again. I played around by myself for eight months while he was performing with Blur in 2015." In October 2014, Albarn was said to be "in the process of reactivating Gorillaz for a 2016 release." In an Instagram post on 30 January 2015, Hewlett posted new drawings of fictional band members Murdoc and Noodle. He also responded to a fan's query by stating, "Yes Gorillaz Returns." Albarn's band Blur released their eighth studio album The Magic Whip on 27 April 2015. Before Blur's tour in support of The Magic Whip, Albarn said, "I'm starting recording in September for a new Gorillaz record." On 19 January 2017, Gorillaz released the first track from the album, "Hallelujah Money" featuring Benjamin Clementine, accompanied by a music video as a non-commercial single on Uproxx's YouTube channel.

Recording
Prior to studio recording, Albarn made use of iPad applications such as GarageBand to create the framework for each song. Albarn had previously utilised his iPad as an audio workstation for The Fall, touting its convenience over the 4-Track recorder he'd previously used for preliminary music production.

To guide collaborators into the "dark fantasy" setting that Albarn envisioned for Humanz, Albarn instructed guest artists to imagine a future in which Donald Trump had won the 2016 United States presidential election. As recording for Humanz began well before Trump had secured the Republican presidential nomination, much less the presidency, the possibility of a Trump presidency was still considered remote by many; collaborator Pusha T (who recorded his contribution in early 2016) later commented on Albarn's inadvertent foresight, saying: "I wrote from the perspective of this day, I was writing from the perspective of a Trump win. When this really happened, I was like 'Wait a minute, what type of crystal ball did this guy have? Why are you even asking me to think along these lines?' I don't think he thought that [Trump] would win, I'm not gonna go that far, but he definitely conceptualized this whole thing."

In April 2016, Hewlett uploaded two video clips onto his Instagram showing the continued work on the album. The first clip featured Liam Bailey and the Twilite Tone. The second clip was a time-lapse video featuring Albarn, Remi Kabaka Jr, the Twilite Tone and Jean-Michel Jarre. On 17 May 2016, Gorillaz were in the studio with Chicago-based hip hop artist Vic Mensa, although Bailey and Mensa's contributions were ultimately left off of the finished album.

In an interview with Q magazine, Albarn revealed that he reached out to collaborate with a number of different artists, many of whom turned him down, including English musician Morrissey, Dionne Warwick – who was unwilling to collaborate as some lyrics on the record conflicted with her religious views, singer Sade, and American rapper Rick Ross. Albarn also revealed in an interview with Song Exploder, that the song "Andromeda", featured a more prominent role for rapper D.R.A.M and at one point, featured contributions from Rag'n'Bone Man (which was ultimately discarded) and with French singer-songwriter Christine and the Queens, which was also unsuccessful. The group also reportedly recorded with Erykah Badu, whom Albarn had previously worked with on his Rocket Juice & the Moon project.

The song "Charger" with Grace Jones was a result of Jones singing over the song's instrumental for four hours, ad-libbing and vibing to it. Overwhelmed by the length of the vocals recorded, Albarn had his studio floor covered in cut up pieces of paper with everything Jones had recorded, finding the fragments that worked and eventually crafting the song from there. A photo of this was also uploaded to Kabaka's Instagram, with the album's other executive producer the Twilite Tone, attempting to place the lyrics in an order for the song. Albarn also revealed that an unnamed collaborator's original vocals were removed from the song, so as to accommodate Jones' vocals. Album recording engineer Stephen Sedgwick's final mix session of "Charger" contains 90 separate tracks.

"We Got the Power" features guest vocals from Jehnny Beth, the lead singer of the British rock band Savages, as well as backing vocals from American rapper D.R.A.M and English singer Noel Gallagher. Albarn welcomed the arrival of Beth as the album was meant to be "a series of conversations between men and women". He hailed her performance, saying: "She sounds like herself, but there are also strong echoes of Siouxsie Sioux. She's brilliant." The song is a particular landmark for Albarn and Gallagher, after their public dislike of each other during what was dubbed by the media as "The Battle of Britpop" in the 1990s. At one point, the song featured backing vocals from Albarn's Blur bandmate Graham Coxon, however his vocals were removed from the final version of the song. "At one point this song had Graham, Noel and me on it and it was sort of heading slightly in the wrong direction. It was becoming almost retro in its sort of spirit and way too rocky for this record so I kind of stripped it right back down again. We play it slightly different live than how it is on the record. It's sort of the song that comes on during the final titles of a film. The climax. I thought Jehnny would take a bit of the testosterone off", Albarn said in an interview with Radio X. He also spoke of working with Gallagher for the first time, which Albarn was very complimentary: "He's fantastic in the studio. It's nice when you see how someone goes about their business. He's great". The song itself started after Albarn was given a Casio MT-40 for his birthday and he began composing the barebones of a demo, which was later fleshed out to become "We Got the Power". The idea to include Jehnny Beth came about after XL Recordings founder Richard Russell said that Gallagher and Albarn "were two rich middle-aged men singing about having the power, which is not a good look". Beth wrote her own lyrics to be included on the song as well as the lyrics that Albarn and Gallagher had also written.

"Andromeda", the album's fourth single, was dedicated to Ethel, the mother of Albarn's longtime partner Suzi Winstanley, who died while Albarn was writing the song. Ethel's death reminded Albarn of Bobby Womack, who had appeared on the group's single "Stylo" and "Cloud of Unknowing" from their album Plastic Beach and appeared on the song "Bobby in Phoenix" from The Fall. Albarn and Russell had also produced Womack's comeback album The Bravest Man in the Universe, prior to Womack's death in June 2014. The sentimentality Albarn felt for lost family and friends was instrumental in the creation of "Andromeda", with Albarn commenting on the song's message: "Take the worst possible outcome, be brave, and remember all the goodness that preceded that... all the beauty that preceded that." Albarn also stated that after a conversation with producer the Twilite Tone, he tried to evoke the sound of Michael Jackson's 1983 single "Billie Jean" from his iconic Thriller album and Hall & Oates' single "I Can't Go for That (No Can Do)", from their album Private Eyes. Twilite Tone produced the song, while Albarn took care of lyrics. The song features D.R.A.M, who originally had a more prominent feature on the song, with a full chorus and verse, however, Albarn stripped the vocals back as the song felt more complete. At one point, the song's name was "I Can't Go for Billie Jean", as a reference to the aforementioned Michael Jackson song and Hall and Oates' song.

De La Soul had previously appeared on Gorillaz previous albums Demon Days and Plastic Beach on the songs "Feel Good Inc." and "Superfast Jellyfish" respectively, and appear on the album's fifth track "Momentz". Albarn revealed that the song was initially supposed to feature American stand-up comedian and actor Dave Chappelle, however, he became convinced after chatting to De La Soul member, Posdnuos. "I didn't hear De La Soul for that. Posdnous shows up. He said, 'I want to do something.' We were trying to get Dave Chappelle to do that. But he knows Pos, and somehow, that's how that happened."

Albarn revealed that there would be alternate versions of songs that would be released, one included an extended version of "Andromeda" with rapper D.R.A.M. and a Middle-Eastern version of "Busted and Blue", which was discovered to feature Syrian musician Faia Younan, who had previously collaborated with Albarn on the Africa Express project The Orchestra of Syrian Musicians and Guests, on which she was featured on the song "Yah Mahla El Fus'ha". While alternate versions of songs also exists, there are also songs that did not make the album, which were registered online by the group, which revealed that the band had collaborated further with Sidiki Diabaté, Little Simz and Azekel (who has backing vocals on the song "Momentz"). These songs were eventually released as the bonus tracks of the "Super Deluxe" edition of Humanz which was released on 3 November 2017.

In an interview with Sound on Sound, recording engineer Stephen Sedgwick and executive producer the Twilite Tone revealed some more of the stories behind the songs on the record. Such as the song "Strobelite", which came from an initial drum pattern made by Albarn on a SEIKO drum machine watch. While the drum pattern was being recorded, the production team were having a conversation, which ended up being recorded and was kept on the final track. The Anthony Hamilton-featuring "Carnival" originated from Albarn's experiences of visiting a carnival in Trinidad and Tobago, which inspired Hamilton in both his lyrics and vocal performance, while song and title "Sex Murder Party" came from a newspaper headline that Twilite Tone and Albarn read, which prompted the song's creation.

While promoting the album Merrie Land by the Good, the Bad & the Queen, Albarn revealed that he had reached out to singer Morrissey, from the Smiths, to appear on the song "Circle of Friendz", which ended up as a bonus track on the album's deluxe edition featuring Brandon Markell Holmes, but was unable to convince him to appear on the song.

Themes
Albarn has said that with Humanz he set out to create something not overtly political, but "an emotional response to politics". The album's overarching theme is the emotional aftermath of an unexpected world-changing event. Albarn removed all references to Donald Trump on the album, saying "There's no references to [Trump] on the record – in fact, any time when anyone made any reference, I edited it out. I don't want to give the most famous man on earth any more fame, particularly. He doesn't need it!" There is however, a bonus track called "The Apprentice", referencing his former reality show. At one point, the album was titled Transformerz, although this was later abandoned, for fear of confusion with the film series of the same name.

Albarn was honoured at the Ivor Novello Awards where he picked up the lifetime achievement award for his work with Blur, Gorillaz, The Good, the Bad & the Queen, as well as his myriad of soundtracks and other work. During his acceptance speech, he spoke out about his love of the band Simple Minds and how they may be shaping the new Gorillaz record: "From someone who grew up in Leytonstone, it was a culture shock to say the least. Anyway, we were in this band and we had a guitarist who was an Edge from U2 obsessive, but we had a more kind of loose bass player who was really Simple Minds. Graham and me were a bit kind of more mercurial about what we like and what we don't like, but they were more adamant. Looking back at it now, I loved pretending that I was in U2, but I just think that Simple Minds were cooler. "Promised You a Miracle" – I listened to it when I started doing this new Gorillaz record and it just blew my mind, and it blew everyone who I was working with's mind. They hadn't even heard of Simple Minds, and they loved it – so that's testament to it being incredible."

Release and promotion

On 6 March 2017, Gorillaz announced they were headlining their own festival called "Demon Dayz" at Margate, England. It took place on 10 June at the Dreamland amusement park, with free access to rides, and was also broadcast live, via Red Bull TV. The tickets were put on sale in the morning of 10 March, at 9:00am, and they sold out hours later. The festival was revealed to feature a number of collaborators from the album and other musicians that influenced the band, such as Vince Staples, De La Soul, Fufanu, Danny Brown, Little Simz, Kali Uchis, Popcaan and Kilo Kish.

On 23 March 2017, four new songs were premiered on various radio stations: "Saturnz Barz" and "Andromeda" on BBC Radio 1, "We Got the Power" on Radio X, and "Ascension" on Beats 1. The same day, all four songs were released for download, and a 360 Virtual Reality music video for "Saturnz Barz" was released in partnership with YouTube, being the first music video featuring the Gorillaz characters since 2012's "DoYaThing".

The same day, Gorillaz redesigned their website and announced a secret live concert at Printworks Nightclub, London, on the evening of 24 March 2017, featuring the first full performance of the album, and made a livestream on their Facebook page at the event.

The fifth single "Let Me Out", featuring Mavis Staples and Pusha T, was released on 6 April 2017.

A Gorillaz-themed augmented reality app created in collaboration with Electronic Beats was released on 10 April 2017, in which users interact with the band members, tour the studios, and listen to playlists made by the members. The next day, Gorillaz announced that the app would also be used to host the "Humanz House Party", a listening event touted as the "largest ever geo-specific listening experience". It took place on 21 April through 23, a week before the album release, and allowed fans to be the first to hear the new album in full. At the same time, Jamie Hewlett revealed in an interview with Q magazine that a 10-episode Gorillaz TV show was in the works.

On 17 April 2017, the Humanz Tour was formally announced on the band's official website, with concerts in Europe, Asia, North and South America. A copy of the album was included with a ticket purchase.

On 31 October 2017, "Garage Palace" featuring Little Simz was released as a single from the "Super Deluxe" Edition of Humanz, which includes 14 additional songs and was released on 3 November 2017.

Reception

Humanz received generally positive reviews from critics. At Metacritic, which assigns a normalised rating out of 100 to reviews from mainstream publications, the album received an average score of 77, based on 32 reviews. Common points of praise from reviewers pertain to the album's political themes, as well as its dark, yet playful "party" sound. Josh Gray of Clash felt that the band had "created their most youthful album yet; a vibrant record which paints a picture of the near future so vivid it seems convincingly real." Kenneth Partridge from Paste gave it an 8.5 rating and wrote "The result: the most vibrant, consistently engaging Gorillaz album yet". Writing for Exclaim!, Cam Lindsay posited that despite the album lacking any "Apple-friendly jingles", it "makes up for it with palatably overarching political themes and sequencing that gives it the wildly entertaining feel of a circus show." Stephen Thomas Erlewine of AllMusic gave the album 4/5 stars (which he would later change to 3.5/5) and stated that he thought of it as more wild and unruly than the band's 2010 album, Plastic Beach, due to the bigger focus on individual tracks as opposed to an overarching concept. He also noted that despite the album's very heavy R&B vibe and political undercurrent, he felt the album overall was "strangely uplifting, as if every musician who entered the studio found solace in the act of creation."

Niall Doherty of Q magazine pointed out Albarn's diminished vocal influence on the album compared to the two albums he had been involved with prior, Everyday Robots and The Magic Whip, concluding the review with "What Humanz lacks in memorable hooks, it makes up for in fist-clenching spirit – and 'We Got The Power' sums that up best. A defiant anthem featuring a thrilling turn from Savages' singer Jehnny Beth, it ensures an album about wading through the dark days ends on a triumphant note." Some reviewers overall felt that much of the band itself and its "cartoon image" fell to the wayside in the wake of its many collaborators. Consequence of Sound writer Nina Corcoran gave Humanz a B− grade, stating "In the end, Humanz structures itself like we’re watching Gorillaz host a party in a trendy club, all while the world burns. By positioning its four digital members just outside of the line of vision, though, it feels like an outlier in the band's catalog — which isn't necessarily a bad thing."

The structure of the album has had some critics draw comparisons to Drake's More Life. In terms of the album structure, critics have been more mixed. In a generally positive review, Alexis Petridis of The Guardian acknowledged the album as a "scattershot collection of tracks, rather than a coherent album." Record Collector thought of it both as a flaw but also its strength, stating that "the album throws it all at you in one gloriously delirious barrage that has no real anchor." Will Hermes of Rolling Stone wrote "If it's an uneven LP, it's fairly brilliant by mixtape standards, which may be the best way to measure it."

The album earned the band the award for British group at the Brit Awards 2018.

Accolades

Commercial performance
In the United Kingdom, the album debuted at number two on the UK Albums Chart.

In the United States, Humanz debuted at number two on the US Billboard 200 behind Kendrick Lamar's Damn, with 140,000 album-equivalent units, of which 115,000 were pure album sales. It serves as Gorillaz's fourth top-ten album in the United States.

Track listing
Adapted from liner notes:

"Andromeda" is listed on physical editions as "Andromeda – For Ethel".
"We Got the Power" is listed on physical editions as "We Got the Power (Version 2:18:482)".

Sample credits

 "Intro: I Switched My Robot Off" contains a sample of Space Shuttle Discovery during launch sequence.
 "Saturnz Barz" contains an uncredited sample of the instructional voice-over of Interactive Planetarium by Scientific Toys Limited.
 "Interlude: The Non-Conformist Oath" contains a sample of "A Wild and Crazy Guy" as written and performed by Steve Martin, from his album A Wild and Crazy Guy.
 "Submission" contains a sample of "Your Love" as written by Jose Gomez, Francis Nicholls, Jamie Principle and Mark Trollan and performed by Jamie Principle featuring Adrienne Jett.
 "Carnival (2-D Special)" contains a sample of "Breathless" as written by Blaxx and Roy Cape.

Personnel
Credits adapted from the liner notes of the Super Deluxe edition of Humanz.

Gorillaz

Damon Albarn – production, vocals, synthesizers, drums, keyboards, programming, guitar
Jamie Hewlett – artwork, design
Stephen Sedgwick – mixing, engineering
Remi Kabaka Jr. – production, drum programming, percussion , drums 
John Davis – mastering
Samuel Egglenton – assistance , additional engineering 

Additional musicians

Ben Mendelsohn – narration 
Vince Staples – vocals 
The Humanz – choir 
Peven Everett – vocals, additional keyboards 
Popcaan – vocals 
De La Soul – vocals 
Azekel – additional vocals 
Jean-Michel Jarre – synthesizers 
The Twilite Tone – production, drums , synthesizers , bass , drum programming 
Kelela – vocals , additional vocals 
Danny Brown – vocals 
Graham Coxon – guitars 
Grace Jones – vocals 
Pauline Black – vocals 
DRAM – vocals , additional vocals 
Roses Gabor – additional vocals 
Cheick Tidiane Seck – additional synthesizers 
Faia Younan – vocals 
Anthony Hamilton – vocals 
Mavis Staples – vocals 
Pusha T – vocals 
Jamie Principle – vocals 
Zebra Katz – vocals 
Little Simz – vocals 
Kali Uchis – vocals 
Benjamin Clementine – vocals 
Sidiki Diabaté – vocals and kora 
Jehnny Beth – vocals 
Noel Gallagher – additional vocals 
Rag'n'Bone Man – vocals 
Ray BLK – vocals 
Kilo Kish – vocals 
Imani Vonzhà – vocals 
Carly Simon – vocals 
Brandon Markell Holmes – additional vocals 

Additional technical

Fraser T. Smith – production consulting , additional production 
Michael Law Thomas – additional engineering 
KT Pipal – assistance 
Casey Cuyao – assistance 
John Foyle – engineering 
Morgan Garcia – additional engineering 
J.U.S. – additional engineering 
Paul Bailey – additional engineering 
Alex Baez – assistance 
Jonathan Lackey – assistance 
Manon Grandjean – assistance 

Additional artwork
LuckyMe Studios – assistance art

Notes
 "The Humanz" consist of Rasul A-Salaam, Starr Busby, Melanie J-B Charles, Drea D'Nur, Giovanni James, Marcus Anthony Johnson, Janelle Kroll, Brandon Markell Holmes, and Imani Vonshà

Singles 
 On 23 March 2017, four singles were released onto Gorillaz YouTube channel and onto streaming services. 
 The first single, "Saturnz Barz" bubbled under the Hot 100 at 101 and peaked at 5 on the US Hot Rock Song chart. In the UK, the single peaked at 87.
 "We Got The Power", the second single, peaked at 13 on the Hot Rock Songs chart and 38 on the Alternative Songs chart.
 "Ascension", the third single, peaked at 11 on the Hot Rock Songs chart. In the UK, the single peaked at 91.
 "Andromeda", the fourth single, peaked at 9 on the Hot Rock Songs chart.
 "Let Me Out", the fifth single, was released on 6 April 2017. It bubbled under the Hot 100 at 115 and peaked at 7 on the Hot Rock Songs chart.
 "The Apprentice", the sixth single, was released on 24 April 2017. It peaked at 18 on the Hot Rock Songs chart.
 "Strobelite", the seventh single, was released on 7 August 2017. It peaked at 22 on the Hot Rock Songs chart.
 "Garage Palace", the eighth single, and "Andromeda (D.R.A.M Special)", the ninth single, were released on 31 October 2017 and 1 December 2017, respectively. They were both released as a part of the "Super Deluxe" edition.

Charts

Weekly charts

Year-end charts

Certifications

Notes

References

2017 albums
Gorillaz albums
Parlophone albums
Albums recorded at Studio 13
Warner Records albums
Albums produced by Damon Albarn